Lavallee Peak is a peak  high just northwest of Gibraltar Peak in the West Quartzite Range of Antarctica. It was mapped by the United States Geological Survey from surveys and U.S. Navy air photos, 1960–1964, and was named by the Advisory Committee on Antarctic Names for Lieutenant David O. Lavallee, U.S. Navy, a biological diver at McMurdo Station during the summers of 1963–64, 1964–65 and 1966–67.

References

Mountains of Victoria Land
Pennell Coast